Alexeyevsk is the name of several inhabited localities in Russia.

Modern localities
Urban localities
Alexeyevsk, Irkutsk Oblast, a work settlement in Kirensky District of Irkutsk Oblast

Rural localities
Alexeyevsk, Bryansk Oblast, a selo in Domanichsky Rural Administrative Okrug of Pochepsky District in Bryansk Oblast;

Historical names
Alexeyevsk, name of Svobodny, a town in Amur Oblast, in 1912–1917

Alternative names
Alexeyevsk, alternative name of Alexeyevskoye, a selo under the administrative jurisdiction of Mari-Turek Urban-Type Settlement in Mari-Tureksky District of the Mari El Republic;

See also
Alexey
Alexeyevsky (disambiguation)